Felip Gomes (born 23 March) is an Indian football player who plays for Churchill Brothers S.C. as a defender.

External links
http://goal.com/en-india/people/india/25974/felip-gomes

1978 births
Living people
Indian footballers
India international footballers
Footballers from Goa
Sporting Clube de Goa players
Churchill Brothers FC Goa players
I-League players
Association football defenders